Mosquito Awareness Week or Mosquito Control Awareness Week is held every year in North and South American countries, including the United States. Mosquito Awareness Week is observed annually in late June. A separate Caribbean Mosquito Awareness Week (CARPA) is held earlier in the year, typically in April or May.

Mosquito Awareness Week raises awareness of diseases spread by mosquitoes, including dengue fever, chikungunya, Zika, yellow fever, and malaria. It aims to reduce mosquito breeding and encourage people to take preventative measures to avoid mosquito bites.

History 
Mosquito Awareness Week began in 2016 in response to the 2015 - 2016 Zika outbreak.

References

External links 

 Pan American Health Organization
 Prevent Mosquito Bites - CDC

Awareness weeks
June observances
Health observances
Diptera pests and diseases